Robert Beckwith (born 12 September 1984) is an English footballer, who plays as a goalkeeper.

Beckwith made his debut for Luton Town, and produced a man of the match display in a 2–2 draw with Bristol City. During his time at Kenilworth Road he was plagued with injuries which ultimately stopped his career progressing with Arsenal being one club that was tracking the highly rated young stopper. In his last season at Luton, he joined Chesterfield on loan before being released. He tried his luck overseas before returning for a spell at Hitchin Town and then Barnet.

He was signed by Barnet ostensibly to provide cover for Lee Harrison, but broke into the first team in January 2008. He starred as the Bees beat Swindon Town on penalties in an FA Cup third round replay, saving the penalty that won the shootout for Barnet. In the next season he was given the number 1 shirt, but lost his place to Harrison and later Ran Kadoch. After being made available for loan in January 2009, Beckwith handed in his resignation at Barnet, saying he had lost his love for the game, however just a couple of weeks later he was snapped up by Grays Athletic. He made his debut in the 2–1 home victory over Altrincham on 7 March 2009.

References

External links

1984 births
Footballers from the London Borough of Hackney
Living people
Association football goalkeepers
English footballers
Luton Town F.C. players
Chesterfield F.C. players
Rugby Town F.C. players
Hitchin Town F.C. players
Barnet F.C. players
Grays Athletic F.C. players
Hemel Hempstead Town F.C. players
English Football League players
National League (English football) players